The SS French Creek was a type T2 tanker, more specifically a T2-SE-A1, that was built in 1944.  The ship was built at Sun Shipbuilding and Drydock Co. in Chester, Pennsylvania as hull number 454 and USMC number 1787.  In 1956, it was acquired by the US Navy from the Maritime Administration and placed in service as the USNS French Creek (T-AO-159).  It was taken out of service and transferred to the US Army in 1967.  It was then sent to Vietnam where it was used as a floating power station until its scrapping in 1971.

References
http://www.t2tanker.org

http://www.navsource.org/archives/09/19159.htm

 

Type T2-SE-A1 tankers
1944 ships
Ships built by the Sun Shipbuilding & Drydock Company
World War II tankers of the United States
Type T2-SE-A1 tankers of the United States Navy